Alexander Dominick Mustaikis (March 26, 1909 – January 17, 1970) was a pitcher in Major League Baseball who played briefly for the Boston Red Sox during the  season. He was born in Chelsea, Massachusetts. 
 
In one season career, Mustaikis posted a 0–1 record with six strikeouts and a 9.00 ERA in six appearances, including one start, three games finished, and 15.0 innings of work.
 
Mustaikis died at the age of 60 in  Scranton, Pennsylvania.

See also
1940 Boston Red Sox season
Boston Red Sox all-time roster

External links
Baseball Reference
Retrosheet
 

Boston Red Sox players
Major League Baseball pitchers
Baseball players from Massachusetts
Sportspeople from Chelsea, Massachusetts
1909 births
1970 deaths
Elmira Pioneers players
Hazleton Red Sox players
Hollywood Stars players
Kansas City Blues players
Little Rock Travelers players
Newark Bears players
Quebec Braves players
Scranton Red Sox players
Syracuse Chiefs players
Toronto Maple Leafs (International League) players
Tyler Governors players
Williamsport Grays players
American expatriate baseball players in Canada